Houplin-Ancoisne is a commune in the Nord department in northern France.

Until 1959, it was known as Houplin-Lez-Seclin.

Heraldry

See also
Communes of the Nord department

References

External links

Houplinancoisne
French Flanders